The Tallahassee Open was a golf tournament on the PGA Tour from 1969 to 1989. It was played at Killearn Country Club in Tallahassee, Florida.

It was founded in 1969 as the Tallahassee Open Invitational. From 1983 to 1985, it was part of the PGA Tour's "Tournament Players Series", a "satellite tour". The purse for the 1989 tournament was $750,000 with 135,000 going to the winner.

The 1974 tournament featured the highest round scores in PGA history by a player who made the 36-hole cut. Mike Reasor severely injured himself horse riding between the second and third rounds. Needing to complete the tournament in order to gain an exemption for the Byron Nelson Classic, Reasor played the final two rounds using only a 5-iron and swinging using just one arm, recording scores of 123 and 114.

From 1990 to 1992, Killearn Country Club hosted a LPGA Tour event by the same name.

Winners

Notes

References

Former PGA Tour events
Golf in Florida
Sports in Tallahassee, Florida
Recurring sporting events established in 1969
Recurring sporting events disestablished in 1989
1969 establishments in Florida
1989 disestablishments in Florida